Eucalyptus leptocalyx, commonly known as Hopetoun mallee, is a species of mallee that is endemic to an area along the south coast of Western Australia. It has smooth bark, lance-shaped adult leaves, flower buds in groups of between nine and fifteen, creamy white flowers and barrel-shaped to cylindrical fruit.

Description
It has smooth brownish over light pink bark. Flowering occurs from September to March and the flowers are creamy white.

Taxonomy and naming
Eucalyptus leptocalyx was first formally described in 1934 by William Blakely from a specimen collected near Hopetoun by Joseph Maiden in 1909. The description was published in Blakely's book, "A Key to the Eucalypts". The specific epithet (leptocalyx) is derived from the ancient Greek words leptos meaning "thin" or "slender" and calyx meaning "cup" or "calyx".

In 2001, Lawrie Johnson and Ken Hill described two subspecies and published the descriptions in the journal Telopea:
 Eucalyptus leptocalyx Blakely subsp. leptocalyx;
 Eucalyptus leptocalyx subsp. petilipes'' L.A.S.Johnson & K.D.Hill has smaller leaves, buds and fruit.

Distribution and habitat
Hopetoun mallee grows in coastal and near-coastal areas between the Fitzgerald River National Park and Israelite Bay where it grows in gravelly sandy-clay soils.

Conservation status
This mallee is classified as "not threatened" by the Western Australian Government Department of Parks and Wildlife.

See also
List of Eucalyptus species

References

Eucalypts of Western Australia
leptocalyx
Myrtales of Australia
Plants described in 1934
Mallees (habit)
Taxa named by William Blakely